The Ronneby (Swedish: Ronnebyån) is a river in Sweden.

References

Rivers of Sweden